Nikolay Yakovlevich Demyanov (Tver – March 19, 1938, Moscow), also known as Demjanov and Demjanow, was a Russian organic chemist and a member of the USSR Academy of Sciences (1929). He is internationally known for the Demjanov rearrangement organic reaction and other discoveries.

He was a recipient of the Lenin Prize in 1930.

Bibliography

External links
 Academician Nikolay Yakovlevich Demyanov

1861 births
1938 deaths
Chemists from the Russian Empire
Soviet chemists
20th-century chemists
Russian inventors
People from Tver
Corresponding Members of the Russian Academy of Sciences (1917–1925)
Full Members of the USSR Academy of Sciences
Imperial Moscow University alumni